This is a list of Estonian television related events from 1984.

Events

Debuts

Television shows

Ending this year

Births
6 January - Priit Loog, actor  
6 February - Piret Järvis, singer, guitarist, and TV host
14 July- Britta Soll, actress

Deaths